Adlan Mairbekovich Amagov (born October 30, 1986) is a Russian mixed martial artist and kickboxer, who most recently competed in the Welterweight division of the Ultimate Fighting Championship. A professional competitor from 2007-2014, Amagov also formerly competed for Strikeforce and is the former Unifight World Champion.

Background
Originally from the small village of Sernovodsk in Chechnya, Amagov was raised in a war-torn country and in 1994 when he was eight years old, Amagov's school was destroyed. Eventually, he relocated to Moscow, where he began training in Combat Sambo with Fedor Emelianenko and Alexander Emelianenko. In June 2007, Amagov made the transition into mixed martial arts.

Mixed martial arts career

Early career
Amagov made his professional mixed martial arts debut in November 2007 in Russia. He lost his debut bout via submission, but soon amassed a record of 8-1-1 with most of his fights taking place in the ProFC promotion. His brothers Musa Amagov and Beslan Amagov are also professional MMA fighters.

Amagov drew considerable attention in 2010 when a video of his spinning hook kick knockout of Maskhat Akhmetov became popular on several MMA message boards and news sites.

He is managed by Sam Kardan and Mike Constantino of MVC Management.

Strikeforce
In the summer of 2011, Adlan Amagov signed with Zuffa and made his U.S. debut at Strikeforce Challengers: Bowling vs. Voelker III against Ron Stallings. Amagov won the fight via split decision.

Amagov was successful in his second bout for Strikeforce as he defeated veteran Anthony Smith via KO in the first round at Strikeforce Challengers: Britt vs. Sayers.

Following his two wins, Amagov made his debut on a main card at Strikeforce: Rockhold vs. Jardine on January 7, 2012. He faced former EliteXC Middleweight Champion Robbie Lawler in the co-main event and lost the fight via TKO (flying knee and punches) early in the first round.

Amagov returned to the promotion on August 18, 2012 at Strikeforce: Rousey vs. Kaufman. He faced Keith Berry at the event and won via TKO early in the first round after a side kick to the knee and punches on the ground.

Ultimate Fighting Championship
On January 19, 2013, it was revealed that Amagov had signed to fight for the UFC.

Amagov made his promotional and Welterweight debut against fellow newcomer and former Strikeforce veteran Chris Spång on April 6, 2013 at UFC on Fuel TV 9. Amagov dominated the fight from start to finish, earning a unanimous decision victory.

Amagov faced TJ Waldburger on October 19, 2013 at UFC 166. He won the fight via knockout in the first round.

Amagov was expected to face Jason High on January 15, 2014 at UFC Fight Night 35.  However, Amagov pulled out of the bout due to injury and was replaced by promotional newcomer Beneil Dariush. After more than a year of absence from the sport, BloodyElbow editor Karim Zidan stated that Amagov had "no interest" in returning to MMA, and that he wants to "watch his kids grow up and is tired of cutting weight".

MMA return
In August 2016, it was announced that Amagov would return to MMA competition.  He faced Jungle Fight champion Dirlei Broenstrup on August 21, 2016 in Russia and won the fight via submission in the first round.

Personal life 
He is a devout sunni Muslim and has a wife and son. On 5 June 2017, Amagov was involved in a violent altercation between rival Chechen business associates in Western Moscow that left two people dead and six others injured. Amagov was accused of stabbing another man in the chest during the encounter.

Championships and accomplishments

Unifight
International Amateur Federation of Unifight
Unifight World Champion
Unifight Europe Champion

Grappling
NAGA
NAGA Championship 2nd Place 2011
NAGA Championship 1st Place 2012

ARG (Army Hand-to-Hand Combat)
Russian Union of Martial Arts
Russian Medalist MVD in Army Hand-to-Hand Combat.

Mixed martial arts record

|-
| Win
| align=center| 14–2–1
| Dirlei Broenstrup
| Submission (armlock)
| League S-70 - Plotforma 7th
| 
| align=center| 1
| align=center| 2:18
| Sochi, Krasnodar Krai,  Russia
| 
|-
| Win
| align=center| 13–2–1
| TJ Waldburger
| KO (punches)
| UFC 166
| 
| align=center| 1
| align=center| 3:00
| Houston, Texas, United States
| 
|-
| Win
| align=center| 12–2–1
| Chris Spång
| Decision (unanimous)
| UFC on Fuel TV: Mousasi vs. Latifi
| 
| align=center| 3
| align=center| 5:00
| Stockholm, Södermanland, Sweden
| 
|-
| Win
| align=center| 11–2–1
| Keith Berry
| TKO (leg kick and punches)
| Strikeforce: Rousey vs. Kaufman
| 
| align=center| 1
| align=center| 0:48
| San Diego, California, United States
| 
|-
| Loss
| align=center| 10–2–1
| Robbie Lawler
| TKO (flying knee and punches)
| Strikeforce: Rockhold vs. Jardine
| 
| align=center| 1
| align=center| 1:48
| Las Vegas, Nevada, United States
| 
|-
| Win
| align=center| 10–1–1
| Anthony Smith
| KO (punches)
| Strikeforce Challengers: Britt vs. Sayers
| 
| align=center| 1
| align=center| 2:32
| Las Vegas, Nevada, United States
| 
|-
| Win
| align=center| 9–1–1
| Ron Stallings
| Decision (split)
| Strikeforce Challengers: Voelker vs. Bowling III
| 
| align=center| 3
| align=center| 5:00
| Las Vegas, Nevada, United States
|  
|-
| Win
| align=center| 8–1–1
| Evgeny Erokhin
| TKO (head kick and punches)
| Draka: Governor's Cup 2010
| 
| align=center| 1
| align=center| 2:28
| Khabarovsk, Khabarovsk Krai, Russia
| 
|-
| Win
| align=center| 7–1–1
| Aleksandar Radosavljevic
| TKO (doctor stoppage)
| ProFC: Union Nation Cup 8
| 
| align=center| 2
| align=center| 2:10
| Odessa, Odessa Oblast, Ukraine
| 
|-
| Draw
| align=center| 6–1–1
| Attila Vegh
| Draw (unanimous)
| APF: Azerbaijan vs. Europe
| 
| align=center| 3
| align=center| 5:00
| Baku, Baku region, Azerbaijan
| 
|-
| Win
| align=center| 6–1
| Shamil Tinagadjiev
| Decision (unanimous)
| ProFC: Commonwealth Cup
| 
| align=center| 2
| align=center| 5:00
| Moscow, Moscow Oblast, Russia
| 
|-
| Win
| align=center| 5–1
| Denys Liadovyi
| TKO (punches)
| ProFC: Union Nation Cup 5
| 
| align=center| 1
| align=center| 2:58
| Nalchik, Kabardino-Balkar Republic, Russia
| 
|-
| Win
| align=center| 4–1
| Maskhat Akhmetov
| KO (spinning hook kick)
| ProFC: Union Nation Cup 4
| 
| align=center| 1
| align=center| 0:17
| Rostov-on-Don, Rostov Oblast, Russia
| 
|-
| Win
| align=center| 3–1
| Gadzhimurad Antigulov
| KO (punches)
| ProFC: Union Nation Cup 2 
| 
| align=center| 1
| align=center| 4:05
| Rostov-on-Don, Rostov Oblast, Russia
| 
|-
| Win
| align=center| 2–1
| Abbdullah Mahmud
| Decision (unanimous)
| ProFC: President Cup
| 
| align=center| 3
| align=center| 5:00
| St. Petersburg, Leningrad Oblast, Russia
| 
|-
| Win
| align=center| 1–1
| Ansar Chalangov
| Decision (unanimous)
| Perm Regional MMA Federation: MMA Professional Cup
| 
| align=center| 2
| align=center| 5:00
| Perm, Perm Krai, Russia
| 
|-
| Loss
| align=center| 0–1
| Oleksiy Oliynyk
| Submission (ezekiel choke) 
| Perm Regional MMA Federation: MMA Professional Cup 
| 
| align=center| 1
| align=center| 1:00
| Perm, Perm Krai, Russia
|

See also
 List of current UFC fighters
 List of male mixed martial artists

References

External links
 
 

1986 births
Living people
Sportspeople from Grozny
Russian male mixed martial artists
Chechen mixed martial artists
Welterweight mixed martial artists
Mixed martial artists utilizing sambo
Mixed martial artists utilizing ARB
Russian male kickboxers
Ultimate Fighting Championship male fighters
Russian people of Chechen descent
Russian Sunni Muslims